A polyamine oxidase (PAO) is an  enzymatic flavoprotein that oxidizes a carbon-nitrogen bond in a secondary amino group of a polyamine donor, using molecular oxygen as an acceptor. The generalized PAO reaction converts three substrates (water, oxygen, and a polyamine with both primary and secondary amino groups) into three products (hydrogen peroxide, an amino-aldehyde, and a primary amine). Different PAOs with varying substrate specificities exist in different organisms. Phylogenetic analyses suggest that PAOs likely evolved once in eukaryotes and diversified by divergent evolution and gene duplication events, though some prokaryotes have acquired PAOs through horizontal gene transfer.

Structure and Mechanism 

Structures of PAOs from corn, brewer's yeast, and mice contain a substrate-binding domain and an FAD-binding domain that secures the FAD cofactor non-covalently. The active site is located at the interface of these domains.  

Active sites in PAOs vary, but some features are essential. The most strictly-conserved active site amino acid codons in PAO genes are a K residue at position 300 and an aromatic residue (F, Y, or H)  at position 403 (numbers refer to homologous positions in the sequence of ZmPAO1, a PAO found in corn).  K300 hydrogen-bonds to a water molecule, which also hydrogen-bonds to the catalytic N5 nitrogen atom of FAD. In corn, this complex modulates redox potential and reoxidation rate of the cofactor and may be involved in stabilizing the reduced cofactor or imine hydrolysis. The electron-dense aromatic ring at position 403 may interact with amino groups in the substrate. Weak interactions with other more variable active site residues are involved in positioning the substrates.

In the active site, FAD oxidizes the secondary amine to an imine,  which water subsequently hydrolyzes, yielding an amino-aldehyde and a primary amine.  Molecular oxygen reoxidizes the FAD, generating hydrogen peroxide.

Metabolism 
PAOs are central to polyamine catabolism. Different organic reaction products result in different metabolites with different fates. Because all PAO reactions release hydrogen peroxide, PAOs are tied to the metabolism of reactive oxygen species, which overlaps with pathways of programmed cell death.

Polyamine catabolism is often upregulated in mammalian tumor cells. Molecules downstream of polyamine oxidation play roles in cell proliferation. Spermidine is a precursor to hypusine, which activates eukaryotic initiation factor 5A isoform 1 (eIF5A) that enables translation of mRNA. Putrescine has effects on mTOR complex 1 and eukaryotic translation initiation factor 4E (eIF4FE). Because of this, multiple anticancer drugs in various stages of clinical trial target PAOs.

In plants, polyamine catabolism is tied closely to stress responses and fruit ripening.

References

EC 1.5.3
Flavoproteins
Iron enzymes
Enzymes of known structure